Bachigualato Federal International Airport, commonly named Culiacán International Airport, is an international airport located at Culiacán, Sinaloa, Mexico. It handles the national and international air traffic of the city of Culiacán.

The airport is among the Top 10 busiest airports in Mexico, and the busiest in domestic traffic and second busiest for international operations in the state of Sinaloa. It is currently handled by Grupo Aeroportuario Centro Norte, having undergone major construction consisting of a new terminal layout and a new boarding system. It has two jetways.

In 2021, Culiacán airport moved 1,970,211 passengers, and 2,426,003 in 2022.

Bachigualato Federal International Airport is named after the neighborhood of Bachigualato, where the airport is located.

In favorable weather, flights from the Baja California peninsula and north arrive to runway 02, and flights from the rest of the country to runway 20.

The state executive announced plans to expand the airport and the construction of a second runway to support Boeing 777 landings.

Facilities

 Number of gates: 5
 Contact positions: 5
 Remote positions: 3
 Number of jetways: 2
 Number of halls: 2 (Domestic & International)
 Number of baggage claiming carousels: 4 (Domestic & International gates)
 Food court and bar (Upper Level)
 Check-in area: (Boarding area & Ticket sales)
 Customs (Arrivals area)
 Taxi & car rentals (Main road & Domestic arrivals area)
 Duty Free (Floor Level & Upper Lever)
 Hotel service (offices):
 Lucerna Hotel
 Fideicomiso
 Parking area
 Aeroméxico offices (Floor Level & Country Courts)
 VivaAerobus offices (Floor Level)
 Volaris offices (Floor Level)

Terminals
The CIA (Culiacán International Airport) has two terminals.

Main Terminal
The Main Terminal is used for all commercial flights, domestic and international. It has two jetways and 3 remote positions.

Terminal expansion
From February to November 2012, the airport began the work of expansion to the terminal building. The work consists of improve the operation, the airport functionality and the passenger comfort, with an expansion of 3,000m², including: the new terminal lobby and the growth in outpatient, remodeling of 2,500m² for passengers, reconfiguration of check-in point on upper level with 3 simultaneous check-in lines, the construction of a vertical circulation core in the front façade including a panoramic elevator, the growth of the waiting lounge area, the shopping area redesign and a projection of an image of modernity in its façade and inside it.

General Aviation Terminal
The General Aviation Terminal (also known as the Private Aviation Terminal) is located next to the Main Terminal.
The Terminal is used for private planes, and helicopters.

Airlines and destinations

Passenger

Destinations map

Cargo

Statistics

Passengers

Busiest routes

Accidents and incidents

 On July 5, 2007, a twin-engine Sabreliner cargo jet failed to take off from the airport due to a loss of control resulting from a tire blowout and slid off the runway onto a highway. Three people died on board the plane and six on the ground; five more were injured.
On April 24, 2012, a Cessna 182 registered XBMPN for private use crashed in the airport few seconds after took off. The plane was heading to Chihuahua Airport and at the time of the crash the plane carried only the pilot who resulted with only minor injuries. The aircraft remained in some trees at the end of the runway, still on airport property.
On January 5, 2023, an Aeromexico Embraer E190 operating a passenger flight to Mexico City International Airport was hit by gunfire from members of a drug cartel. There were no injuries amongst the passengers or crew on board. A Mexican Air Force 737-800 was also shot at.

See also
 List of the busiest airports in Mexico

References

External links

 Official Culiacán Airport website
 Grupo Aeroportuario Centro Norte de México

Airports in Sinaloa
Culiacán